Krishnaben Khakrawala is an Indian television series that premiered on Sony Entertainment Television on 29 November 2010. The series is produced by Neela Tele Films. It ended on 29 September 2011   because of low ratings.

Plot

Krishnaben Khakhrawala's story is based on the Khakhra of Krishnaben. People like and love Krishnaben more than her Khakhras. She is about 45 years old, and is an icon for the common man. Her energy, hard work and her image of an ideal mother is recognized by people in this region. She is a sensitive business woman also.

Life of Krishnaben has been a mixed bag of joy and pain but Krishnaben has taken everything in her stride to become what she is today. Krishnaben's husband, Ravi died within 12 years of their marriage. Krishnaben took responsibility of her 3 sons-10 years old Ilesh, 9 years old Nilay, 7 years old twins Uday and a daughter – Divya very carefully. Krishnaben raised the children and faced life with a lively and undying spirit. She is also a loving, caring and religious woman. She has principle, positive thinking and a strong will.

Even though Krishnaben is a widow, she dresses up well for her children's sake. The story of Krishnaben Khakhrawala on Sony TV begins at a point when, the children want their mother to stop working hard by selling snacks and live peacefully and relax with them. Krishnaben also respects her children's demand. She had sacrificed her life, working hard day and night for her children in this serial. She had taught them good values.

Cast

Main
 Indira Krishnan as Krishna Ravi Patel a.k.a. Krishnaben Khakrawala - Ilesh, Nilay, Uday and Divya's mother, Bhoomi 's mother in law. Ravi's widow. She is a hardworking woman by making khakras and businesswoman; Her husband died within 12 years of their marriage and she raised her children and faced life with a lively and undying spirit; She is a loving, caring and religious woman and a homemaker; Her shop is near her home in the Ambawadi chawl. (2010-2011)
 Rajesh Shringarpure as Ravi Patel :Krishna's late Husband ; Ilesh, Nilay, Uday and Divya's Father 
 Nehalaxmi Iyer as Divya Ravi Patel :Krishna and Ravi's daughter; Elesh, Nilay, Uday's sister; Bhoomi's sister-in-law.(2010-2011)
 Mehul Vyas as Uday Ravi Patel- Elesh, Nilay, Divya's brother; Krishna and Ravi's youngest son.
 Dhruvraj Sharma as Nilay Ravi Patel: Krishna and Ravi's son, Elesh, Uday and Divya's brother
 Sohan Master as Ilesh Ravi Patel- Krishna and Ravi's elder son; Nilay, Uday and Divya's elder brother; Bhoomi's husband.

Recurring
 Shilpa Raizada as Basanti
 Sonia Kapoor as Mitali Kapoor
 Rita Bhaduri as Santu Baa She is a rich woman and likes show off her wealth and She wanted to stay Bhoomi and Elesh in a flat not in a chawl; she had fights with Krishnaben. She is from Surat; Bhoomi's grandmother.(2011)
 Massheuddin Qureshi as Bhumi's father
 Jyoti Patel as Lakshmi
 Simran Khanna as Bhoomi Elesh Patel - Elesh's wife ; Krishnaben's daughter in law
 Vinayak Ketkar as Saraswati's husband
 Unknown as Bapuji: Ravi's father; Krishna's father-in-law; Elesh, Nilay, Uday and Divya's grandfather.
 Unknown as Gayatri
 Unknown as Durga
 Mehul Nisar
 Unknown as Suresh Bhai
 Mansi Jain as Nikita: Divya's bully.
Deepak Pareek as Elesh's .boss

References

External links
Krishnaben Khakhrawala Official Site on Sony TV India
Official Site on SET Asia

Sony Entertainment Television original programming
Indian drama television series
2011 Indian television series endings
Indian comedy television series
2010 Indian television series debuts